François Bouchard (born August 8, 1973) is a Canadian former professional ice hockey player. In 2001, he was Swedish ice hockey champion with Djurgårdens IF and in 2004, he was German ice hockey champion with Frankfurt Lions.

References

External links

1973 births
Living people
Djurgårdens IF Hockey players
HPK players
Oulun Kärpät players
Modo Hockey players
ERC Ingolstadt players
Vienna Capitals players
Adler Mannheim players
Frankfurt Lions players
Augsburger Panther players
St. John's Maple Leafs players
Charlotte Checkers (1993–2010) players
Northeastern Huskies men's ice hockey players
Canadian expatriate ice hockey players in Austria
Canadian expatriate ice hockey players in Germany
Canadian expatriate ice hockey players in Sweden
National Hockey League supplemental draft picks
Tampa Bay Lightning draft picks
Canadian expatriate ice hockey players in the United States
Canadian expatriate ice hockey players in Finland